Gennadi is a Greek village, seat of the municipal unit of South Rhodes, on the island of Rhodes, South Aegean region. In 2011 its population was 671.

Overview
The village is 64 km from the town of Rhodes and 27 km from ancient Lindos and 65 km from the Airport of Rhodes. It is an agriculture place with a bit of tourism located on the south east side of Rhodes coast.

References

External links

South Rhodes website

Populated places in Rhodes